Mariam Danelia (born 6 May 1997) is a Georgian footballer, who plays as a forward for Sivasspor in the Turkish Women's Super league, and was a member of the Georgia women's national team.

Club career
She played for KSK Lanchkhuti in her country, and took part at the 2020–21 UEFA Women's Champions League.

By December 2021, Danelia moved to Turkey and signed with the newly founded club Sivasspor to play in the 2021-22 Turkcell Super League.

International career
Danelia has been capped for the Georgia national team, appearing for the team during the 2019 FIFA Women's World Cup qualifying cycle.

References

External links
 
 
 

1997 births
Living people
Women's footballers from Georgia (country)
Georgia (country) women's international footballers
Women's association football forwards
Expatriate women's footballers from Georgia (country)
Expatriate women's footballers in Turkey
Sivasspor (women's football) players
Turkish Women's Football Super League players
Expatriate sportspeople from Georgia (country) in Turkey